The Hamburg Metropolitan Region is a metropolitan area centred around the city of Hamburg in northern Germany, consisting of eight districts in the federal state of Lower Saxony, six districts in the state of Schleswig-Holstein and two districts in the state of Mecklenburg-Vorpommern along with the city-state of Hamburg itself.

History
On 1 January 2006 the office of the Hamburg Metropolitan Region opened, as agreed in a state treaty of cooperation between Hamburg, Lower Saxony and Schleswig-Holstein.

Geography
Since then it has expanded to cover the districts of Ludwigslust-Parchim (partially from 2012, entirely from 2017) and Nordwestmecklenburg (from 2012) in the state of Mecklenburg-Vorpommern.

* Districts and independent cities.
† Ludwigslust was merged into Ludwigslust-Parchim in 2011; pop. data for 2010

Larger Urban Zones

The Hamburg Larger Urban Zone (LUZ) as defined by Eurostat's Urban Audit covers an area of 7,303 km2 and in 2004 had a population of 3,134,620 inhabitants. The Larger Urban Zone covers only the city of Hamburg and its directly neighbouring districts. The Hamburg LUZ corresponds with the service area of the Hamburger Verkehrsverbund (HVV) transport association with an average population density of at least 150 inhabitants/km2.

* Districts and independent cities.
† not part of the Hamburg Metropolitan Region

See also

Metropolitan regions in Germany
List of metropolitan areas in the European Union by GDP

References

External links
Metropolregion Hamburg - official webpage

Geography of Hamburg
Geography of Lower Saxony
Geography of Schleswig-Holstein
Metropolitan areas of Germany
Economy of Hamburg